The Michael Faraday Medal and Prize is a gold medal awarded annually by the Institute of Physics in experimental physics. The award is made "for outstanding and sustained contributions to experimental physics." The medal is accompanied by a prize of £1000 and a certificate.

Historical development 
 1914-1965  Guthrie Lecture initiated to remember Frederick Guthrie, founder of the Physical Society (which merged with the Institute of Physics in 1960). 
 1966-2007 Guthrie Medal and Prize  (in response to changed conditions from when the lecture was first established). From 1992, it became one of the Institute's Premier Awards.
 2008–present Michael Faraday Medal and Prize

Medalists and lecturers

Faraday medalists
 2022 Nikolay Zheludev, "For international leadership, discoveries and in-depth studies of new phenomena and functionalities in photonic nanostructures and nanostructured matter."
 2021 Bucker Dangor, "For outstanding contributions to experimental plasma physics, and in particular for his role in the development of the field of laser-plasma acceleration."
 2020 Richard Ellis, "For over 35 years of pioneering contributions in faint-object astronomy, often with instruments he funded and constructed, which have opened up the early universe to direct observations."
 2019 Roy Taylor, "For his extensive, internationally leading contributions to the development of spectrally diverse, ultrafast-laser sources and pioneering fundamental studies of nonlinear fibre optics that have translated to scientific and commercial application."
 2018 Jennifer Thomas, "For her outstanding investigations into the physics of neutrino oscillations, in particular her leadership of the MINOS/MINOS+ long-baseline neutrino oscillation experiment."
2017 Jeremy Baumberg, "For his investigations of many ingenious nanostructures supporting novel and precisely engineered plasmonic phenomena relevant to single molecule and atom dynamics, Raman spectroscopies and metamaterials applications."
2016 Jenny Nelson," For her pioneering advances in the science of nanostructured and molecular semiconductor materials "
2015 Henning Sirringhaus, "For transforming our knowledge of charge transport phenomena in organic semiconductors as well as our ability to exploit them"
2014  Alexander Giles Davies and Edmund Linfield, "For their outstanding and sustained contributions to the physics and technology of the far-infrared (terahertz) frequency region of the electromagnetic spectrum"
2013 Edward Hinds, "For his innovative and seminal experimental investigations into ultra-cold atoms and molecules"
2012 Roy Sambles, "For his pioneering research in experimental condensed matter physics"
2011 Alan Andrew Watson, "For his outstanding leadership within the Pierre Auger Observatory, and the insights he has provided to the origin and nature of ultra high energy cosmic rays"
2010 Athene Donald, "For her many highly original studies of the structures and behaviour of polymers both synthetic and natural"
 2009 Donal Bradley, "For his pioneering work in the field of 'plastic electronics'"
 2008 Roger Cowley, "For pioneering work in the development and application of neutron and X-ray scattering techniques to the physics of a wide range of important solid and liquid-state systems"

Guthrie medalists

Guthrie lecturers

External links 
 List of Faraday Medal and Prize recipients and some Guthrie medal and prize recipients

See also 
 Institute of Physics Awards
 List of physics awards
 List of awards named after people
 Royal Society of London Michael Faraday Prize
 IET Faraday Medal

References 

Awards established in 1914
Awards of the Institute of Physics